Kale Endüstri Holding is a Turkish holding company which was established in 1986. It operates in production, distribution, sale and export in the sectors of safety locks, cylinders, electronic locks, screws, steel doors, safe boxes, fire doors and window systems. The locomotive of the holding is Kale Kilit, the leading company of Turkey in its sector, also one of the prominent companies, as integrated plant, in the global safety lock market.

History

A small workshop at Tahtakale 

The company was founded by Sadık Özgür, as a small workshop at Tahtakale/Istanbul in 1953. The first "domestic manufacturing of the safety locks" in Turkey carried out despite the challenging conditions in the country at that period. The firm grew rapidly, relocated to a bigger place at Bahçelievler/Istanbul and also started to produce padlocks. In 1958 it was renamed as Kale Kolektif Şirketi.

The first company export safety locks from Turkey 

Kale Kolektif Şirketi became the first company that exports safety locks from Turkey in 1974. In 1979 production facility at Bahçelievler/Istanbul moved out to a new place at Güngören/Istanbul. This facility was the first integrated technological plant in Turkey. At the same period the company decided to move on under the name of Kale Kilit ve Kalıp A.Ş.

Establishment of Kale Endüstri Holding 

After fitting multiple developments into the year 1979 new and important steps began to be taken one after another. Kale Vida Sanayi A.Ş. which was founded in 1980 followed by Kale Madeni Eşya ve Pazarlama A.Ş. in 1981 and Kale Dış Ticaret A.Ş. in 1986. At the same year all the companies founded by Kale were collected under the umbrella of Kale Endüstri Holding A.Ş.

Companies under the umbrella of Kale Endüstri Holding 

 Kale Kilit ve Kalıp Sanayi A.Ş.
 Kale Kilit Free Zone Co, Dubai.
 Kale Kilit Dış Ticaret A.Ş.
 Kale Çelik Eşya Sanayi A.Ş.
 Kale Kapı Pencere Sistemleri Paz. Ve Tic. A.Ş.
 Kale Sigorta Acenteliği A.Ş.
 Kale Yapı ve Ticaret A.Ş.
 Kale İnşaat Sanayi ve Ticaret A.Ş.

Manufacturing companies based in Istanbul